The 2017 IIHF World Championship Division II was an international ice hockey tournament run by the Zurich, Switzerland-based International Ice Hockey Federation. Group A was contested in Galati, Romania from 3 to 9 April 2017 and Group B in Auckland, New Zealand from 4 to 10 April 2017.

Bids
There were three official bids to host Group A Championships.

  Iceland
 Reykjavik 
 Iceland had previously hosted these championships in 2015, in Reykjavik.

  Romania
 Galați
Romania had previously hosted these championships twice, the 2001 edition in Bucharest, and again in 2008, in Miercurea Ciuc. The proposed arena was the Galați Skating Rink.

  Serbia
 Belgrade or Novi Sad
 Serbia has hosted the championships a number of times. Belgrade hosted twice, in 2005 and 2014, whilst Novi Sad hosted in 2009. In addition, Novi Sad also played host to the competition in 2002 whilst known as Serbia and Montenegro.

The decision on hosts was made on May 21, 2016. The bid from Romania gained a majority vote and as a result Galati will host the competition.

There were also two official bids to host Group B Championships.

  New Zealand
 Auckland
New Zealand had previously hosted these championships in 2006. The proposed arena was Paradice Botany Downs.

  Turkey
 Ankara
Turkey had previously hosted these championships in 2013, in İzmit.

The decision on hosts was made on May 21, 2016. The bid from New Zealand received the majority of the votes, and as a result Auckland will host the competition.

Venues

Group A tournament

Participants

Match officials
4 referees and 7 linesmen were selected for the tournament.

Referees
 Aaro Brännare
 Andrea Moschen
 Andrei Shrubok
 Ramon Sterkens

Linesmen
 Lodewyk Beelen
 Markus Eberl
 Benas Jakšys
 Stian Løsnesløkken
 István Máthé
 Levente-Szilard Siko
 Vladimir Yefremov

Standings

Results
All times are local (UTC+3).

Awards and statistics

Awards
Best players selected by the directorate:
Best Goalkeeper:  Anthony Kimlin
Best Defenseman:  Dominik Crnogorac
Best Forward:  Csanád Fodor
Source: IIHF.com

Scoring leaders
List shows the top skaters sorted by points, then goals.

GP = Games played; G = Goals; A = Assists; Pts = Points; +/− = Plus/minus; PIM = Penalties in minutes; POS = Position
Source: IIHF.com

Goaltending leaders
Only the top five goaltenders, based on save percentage, who have played at least 40% of their team's minutes, are included in this list.

TOI = Time on ice (minutes:seconds); SA = Shots against; GA = Goals against; GAA = Goals against average; Sv% = Save percentage; SO = Shutouts
Source: IIHF.com

Group B tournament

Participants

Match officials
4 referees and 7 linesmen were selected for the tournament.

Referees
 Chris Deweerdt
 Scott Ferguson
 Kenji Kosaka
 Gints Zviedrītis

Linesmen
 Chae Young-jin
 Justin Cornell
 Tyler Haslemore
 Edward Howard
 Nicholas Lee
 Frederic Monnaie
 Sotaro Yamaguchi

Standings

Results
All times are local (UTC+12).

Awards and statistics

Awards
Best players selected by the directorate:
Best Goalkeeper:  Rick Parry
Best Defenseman:  Michael Kozevnikov
Best Forward:  Zhang Hao
Source: IIHF.com

Scoring leaders
List shows the top skaters sorted by points, then goals.

GP = Games played; G = Goals; A = Assists; Pts = Points; +/− = Plus/minus; PIM = Penalties in minutes; POS = Position
Source: IIHF.com

Goaltending leaders
Only the top five goaltenders, based on save percentage, who have played at least 40% of their team's minutes, are included in this list.

TOI = Time on ice (minutes:seconds); SA = Shots against; GA = Goals against; GAA = Goals against average; Sv% = Save percentage; SO = Shutouts
Source: IIHF.com

References

2017
Division II
2017 IIHF World Championship Division II
2017 IIHF World Championship Division II
Rom
2017 IIHF World Championship Division II
2017 IIHF World Championship Division II
2010s in Auckland
April 2017 sports events in Europe
April 2017 sports events in New Zealand